The 1984 United States presidential election in Virginia took place on November 6, 1984. All 50 states and the District of Columbia, were part of the 1984 United States presidential election. Virginia voters chose 12 electors to the Electoral College, which selected the president and vice president of the United States.

Virginia was won by incumbent United States President Ronald Reagan of California, who was running against former Vice President Walter Mondale of Minnesota. Reagan ran for a second time with incumbent Vice President and former C.I.A. Director George H. W. Bush of Texas, and Mondale ran with Representative Geraldine Ferraro of New York, the first major female candidate for the vice presidency.

The presidential election of 1984 was a very partisan election for Virginia, with just under 99% of the electorate voting only either Democratic or Republican, and only three candidates appearing on the ballot. Only two of Virginia's counties or independent cities failed to give either Mondale or Reagan an outright majority: the city of Franklin gave Reagan a plurality, and Greensville County gave Mondale a plurality. Mondale's best performance was in Charles City County, which gave him 68.7% of its vote; Reagan's was in the city of Poquoson, which gave him 84.7%.

Virginia weighed in for this election as 5% more Republican than the national average. , this is the last election in which the independent cities of Franklin, Lexington, Roanoke, and Falls Church voted for the Republican candidate. Reagan won Virginia by a landslide 25% margin. The Old Dominion, which had been the only former Confederate state to vote for Gerald Ford in 1976, had, unlike many other Southern states, not even been particularly close in 1980: Virginia rejected the incumbent Southerner, Jimmy Carter, in favor of Reagan by nearly 13%. 1984 confirmed Virginia's position as a center of the emerging Republican South; Reagan's 62.3% vote share in the state made it his 17th best nationally, and his fourth-best in the Old Confederacy, after Florida, Texas, and South Carolina. (Of those three, Florida and Texas had similarly decisively rejected Carter in 1980.)

Reagan performed well throughout all of Virginia's regions, relegating Mondale mostly to some largely African-American counties in the east, some highly unionized coal counties in southwest Virginia, and the independent cities of Alexandria, Norfolk, Richmond, and Portsmouth. Particularly noteworthy, however, was Reagan's strong performance in Virginia's large, suburban counties: he got over 60% of the vote in Fairfax County, which cast the most votes of any of the state's jurisdictions, and over 70% in the independent city of Virginia Beach, Henrico County, and Chesterfield County. He also got over 2/3 of the vote in the emerging exurb of Prince William County. In a noteworthy shift against the state and national trend, however, Mondale flipped Arlington County, making Reagan the first Republican since William Howard Taft in 1908 to win the White House without carrying the county.

Democratic platform

Walter Mondale accepted the Democratic nomination for presidency after pulling narrowly ahead of Senator Gary Hart of Colorado and Rev. Jesse Jackson of Illinois - his main contenders during what would be a very contentious Democratic primary. During the campaign, Mondale was vocal about reduction of government spending, and, in particular, was vocal against heightened military spending on the nuclear arms race against the Soviet Union, which was reaching its peak on both sides in the early 1980s.

Taking a (what was becoming the traditional liberal) stance on the social issues of the day, Mondale advocated for gun control, the right to choose regarding abortion, and strongly opposed the repeal of laws regarding institutionalized prayer in public schools. He also criticized Reagan for his economic marginalization of the poor, stating that Reagan's reelection campaign was "a happy talk campaign," not focused on the real issues at hand.

A very significant political move during this election: the Democratic Party nominated Representative Geraldine Ferraro to run with Mondale as Vice President. Ferraro was the first female candidate to receive such a nomination from the party in United States history. She said in an interview at the 1984 Democratic National Convention that this action "opened a door which will never be closed again," speaking to the role of women in politics.

Republican platform

By 1984, Reagan was very popular with voters across the nation as the President who saw them out of the economic stagflation of the early and middle 1970s, and into a period of (relative) economic stability.

The economic success seen under Reagan was politically accomplished (principally) in two ways. The first was initiation of deep tax cuts for the wealthy, and the second was a wide-spectrum of tax cuts for crude oil production and refinement, namely, with the 1980 Windfall profits tax cuts. These policies were augmented with a call for heightened military spending, the cutting of social welfare programs for the poor, and the increasing of taxes on those making less than $50,000 per year. Collectively called "Reaganomics", these economic policies were established through several pieces of legislation passed between 1980 and 1987.

These new tax policies also arguably curbed several existing tax loopholes, preferences, and exceptions, but Reaganomics is typically remembered for its trickle down effect of taxing poor Americans more than rich ones. Reaganomics has (along with legislation passed under presidents George H. W. Bush and Bill Clinton) been criticized by many analysts as "setting the stage" for economic troubles in the United States after 2007, such as the Great Recession.

Virtually unopposed during the Republican primaries, Reagan ran on a campaign of furthering his economic policies. Reagan vowed to continue his "war on drugs," passing sweeping legislation after the 1984 election in support of mandatory minimum sentences for drug possession.  Furthermore, taking a (what was becoming the traditional conservative) stance on the social issues of the day, Reagan strongly opposed legislation regarding comprehension of gay marriage, abortion, and (to a lesser extent) environmentalism, regarding the final as simply being bad for business.

Results

Results by county or independent city

By congressional district
All 10 congressional districts, including 4 that elected Democratic congressmen, voted for Reagan.

See also
 Presidency of Ronald Reagan

References

Virginia
1984
1984 Virginia elections